Bill Evans...Person We Knew is an album by saxophonist Larry Schneider and pianist Andy LaVerne performing compositions associated with Bill Evans recorded in 1992 and released on the Danish label, SteepleChase.

Reception 

Ken Dryden of AllMusic stated "The thought that went into the arrangements and song selections (as well as the consistently high level of playing) make this tribute to Evans an essential acquisition for anyone who is a fan of his many contributions to jazz".

Track listing 
All compositions by Bill Evans except where noted.
 "Re: Person I Knew" – 4:51
 "34 Skidoo" – 6:50
 "Dream Gypsy" (Judith Veevers) – 8:44
 "Orbit (Unless It's You)" – 5:37
 "Time Remembered" – 6:48
 "Show-Type Tune" – 7:20
 "Detour Ahead" (Lou Carter, Herb Ellis, John Frigo) – 8:44
 "Israel" (John Carisi) – 3:03
 "Elsa" (Earl Zindars) – 6:05
 "Funkallero" – 5:11
 "Bill's Signature" – 0:19

Personnel 
Larry Schneider – tenor saxophone
Andy LaVerne – piano

References 

 

Andy LaVerne albums
1992 albums
SteepleChase Records albums
Bill Evans tribute albums